The following are the national records in track cycling in the United States maintained by the United States' national cycling federation: USA Cycling.

Men

Women

References
General
United States Track Cycling Records 18 August 2021 updated
Specific

External links
USA Cycling web site

United States
Records
Track cycling
Track cycling